Ryan Duffy may refer to:

 Ryan Duffy (cricketer) (born 1991), New Zealand cricketer
 Ryan Duffy (journalist), American journalist with Vice Media
 F. Ryan Duffy (1888–1979), Wisconsin jurist and politician